Quo may refer to:

 Quo (group), a 1990s hip hop group, or their 1994 album
 Quo (Status Quo album), 1974
 Quo (magazine), a Spanish-language magazine
 Akwa Ibom Airport, IATA airport code "QUO"

See also
 Quo vadis (disambiguation)
 Status Quo (disambiguation)